A stay-at-home parent is a parent that remains at home while the other parent works outside the home. Stay-at-home parents are generally responsible for domestic chores, including childrearing. Historically, stay-at-home mothers were more common, but since the increasing presence of women in the workplace starting in the latter half of the twentieth century, stay-at-home dads have become more common.

External links

 
Home economics
Family